Cyathea feeana is a species of fern in the family Cyatheaceae, native to Southeast Brazil. It was first described by Carl Frederik Albert Christensen in 1905 as Alsophila feeana.

References

feeana
Flora of Southeast Brazil
Plants described in 1905